Tengku Muhammad Ismail ibni Sultan Mizan Zainal Abidin (born 1 March 1998) is the Yang di-Pertuan Muda (Crown Prince) of Terengganu. He is the son of the current Sultan of Terengganu, Sultan Mizan Zainal Abidin and Sultanah Nur Zahirah,the Sultanah of Terengganu. He also was appointed as Regent of the state from 2006 to 2011 during his father's term as Yang di-Pertuan Agong (the elective federation monarch) of Malaysia.

Biography 
Tengku Muhammad Ismail was born on 1 March 1998 as the eldest son and second child of Tengku Mizan Zainal Abidin, the Yang di-Pertuan Muda (Crown Prince) of Terengganu and To’ Puan Seri Rozita binti Adil Bakeri. His father became the Sultan of Terengganu shortly after his birth, after which his mother became known as Permaisuri Nur Zahirah (née Rozita binti Adil Bakeri),the Permaisuri of Terengganu.

He was appointed the Yang di-Pertuan Muda (Crown Prince) of Terengganu on 12 January 2006.

After Sultan Mizan was elected as Yang di-Pertuan Agong, he appointed Tengku Muhammad Ismail, then aged eight, as Regent of Terengganu on 12 November 2006. Because of Tengku Muhammad Ismail's young age, a Regency Advisory Council was established to discharge his duties for him. The council's members were Tengku Baderulzaman, Sultan Mizan's younger brother, Tengku Sulaiman Sultan Ismail, Sultan Mizan's uncle, and Federal Court judge Abdul Kadir Sulaiman. He was proclaimed as regent during a ceremony on 12 December.

As regent, he presided over the swearing in of Menteri Besar Ahmad Said following the 2008 general election.

On 30 August 2010, upon reaching age 12 (baligh, the Islamic age of puberty), Tengku Muhammad Ismail was formally installed as Regent during a ceremony at Istana Maziah. A Regency Representative Council was formed to discharge his duties as regent while he left the country to pursue his studies. The council consisted of Sultan Mizan's brother Tengku Mustaffa Kamel, and previous members of the Regency Advisory Council, Tengku Sulaiman and Abdul Kadir Sulaiman.

Interests 
Like his father, Tengku Muhammad Ismail is an equestrian, and has participated in international events. In June 2010, he finished in second place in the 90 km race at the RTES/D'Armor French Open in Corlay.

Honours 
 : 
  Member of the Royal Family Order of Terengganu (DKR, 14 December 2011).
  First Class of the Family Order of Terengganu (DK I, 12 December 2006).
  Knight Grand Companion of the Order of Sultan Mizan Zainal Abidin of Terengganu (SSMZ).

Ancestry

References 

1998 births
Living people
Heirs apparent
Royal House of Terengganu
Malaysian people of Malay descent
Malaysian Muslims
Members of the Supreme Royal Family Order of Terengganu
Members of the Royal Family Order of Terengganu
Malaysian people of Thai descent
People from Terengganu
Sons of monarchs